Hawa Mahal is one of the 200 Legislative Assembly constituencies of Rajasthan state in India. It is in Jaipur district.

Member of Legislative Assembly

Election results

2018

See also
List of constituencies of the Rajasthan Legislative Assembly
Jaipur district

References

Assembly constituencies of Rajasthan
Jaipur district